Bungo is a bairro of Luanda, the capital city of Angola. It is the site of the principal passenger terminus of the Luanda Railway. In 2013, work began on doubling the railway track from Bungo station to Baía.

See also 
 Railway stations in Angola

References 

Luanda